is located between Hachiōji, Tokyo and Fujino, Kanagawa Prefecture.

References

Neighborhoods of Tokyo
Jinba
Jinba
Western Tokyo